That's Life may refer to:

Film and television
That's Life! (film), a 1986 comedy-drama directed by Blake Edwards
That's Life (C'est la vie), a 1981 French film directed by Paul Vecchiali
That's Life (1998 film) (Così è la vita), an Italian film by Aldo, Giovanni & Giacomo
That's Life!, a 1970s–1990s UK magazine-style TV series
That's Life (1968 TV series), an American television musical comedy series
That's Life (1998 TV series), an American sitcom
That's Life (2000 TV series), an American drama
"That's Life", an episode of The Fairly OddParents

Music

Albums
 That's Life (Frank Sinatra album), 1966
 That's Life (Julia Fordham album), 2004
 That's Life (Neal McCoy album), 2005
 That's Life (Russell Watson album), 2007
 That's Life (Sham 69 album), 1978
 That's Life, a 1996 album by Gangway
That's Life – Can't Get Enough, an album by Mick Ralphs

Songs
 "That's Life" (song), by Dean Kay and Kelly Gordon, 1963
 "That's Life" (88-Keys song), 2019
 "That's Life", a song by Lime Cordiale from the 2020 album 14 Steps to a Better You
 "That's Life", a 2021 song by Still Woozy

Publications
That's Life (magazine), a UK true-story magazine for young women
That's Life! (Australian magazine), a reality-based magazine

See also
That's Live, an album by Victory
"That Life", a 2021 song by Unknown Mortal Orchestra from the album V
C'est la vie (disambiguation)